G. bulbosa may refer to:
 Gibberula bulbosa, a minute sea snail species in the genus Gibberula
 Gigantea bulbosa, a brown alga species

See also
 Bulbosa